Fernando Carro Morillo (born 1 April 1992) is a Spanish athlete specialising in the 3000 metres steeplechase. He represented his country at the 2015 World Championships in Beijing narrowly missing the final. In 2017, he competed in the men's 3000 metres steeplechase at the 2017 World Athletics Championships held in London, England.

Competition record

References

External links

 
 
 
 
 

1992 births
Living people
Athletes from Madrid
Spanish male steeplechase runners
Olympic athletes of Spain
Athletes (track and field) at the 2016 Summer Olympics
World Athletics Championships athletes for Spain
European Championships (multi-sport event) silver medalists
European Athletics Championships medalists
Spanish Athletics Championships winners
Athletes (track and field) at the 2018 Mediterranean Games
Mediterranean Games competitors for Spain
Athletes (track and field) at the 2020 Summer Olympics